James Riordan (born February 15, 1969 in Cleveland, Ohio) is a New York City-based Broadway, film and television actor.

Theatre work

Broadway 
On Broadway James Riordan played Frank Whitworth in Jerusalem with Mark Rylance, and in The Elephant Man with Billy Crudup, Kate Burton and Rupert Graves. The New York Daily News review of The Elephant Man called his performance "wonderful" in a "variety of roles" and Curtain UP said, "The supporting cast is also well chosen, with especially good work from Jack Gilpin, and James Riordan". James Riordan's other Broadway credits are "Present Laughter" with Kevin KlineDance of Death starring Helen Mirren and Ian McKellen and the comedy Noises Off by Michael Frayn,

Off-Broadway

The Countess 

Off-Broadway James Riordan portrayed Victorian art critic John Ruskin in The Countess by Gregory Murphy at both the Samuel Beckett and later the Lamb's Theatre Theater. The New York Times called the performance "excellent". Time Out wrote "Riordan and Woodward have a thrilling, tightly wound confidence on stage.  These are two heavyweight performances." TheaterMania wrote "James Riordan gives a stunning performance in what may well be the play's most difficult role. Ostensibly playing the villain, Riordan gives his Ruskin dignity and vulnerability. He is, in the end, as much a victim as Effie. As the plot unfolds, you can see the character's arrogance as well as his shame"; and The Star-Ledger said "Riordan is impressive as Ruskin, expansive to the point of tears as the critic describes a work of art that he finds beautiful, yet curiously chill when he encounters genuine emotions." The New York Press wrote of the performance "What impresses itself most on the mind and memory are the two central performances. – I fully appreciated the artistry in Mr. Riordan's performance as the famous art critic, evincing in the play's opening moments a kind of scholarly preening that is neither ridiculous nor unattractive, a lecture-hall combination of magnanimity and authority that keeps us wondering, long afterward, precisely what we're seeing, even if we already know the story. There's a good deal of grace and nuance in his portrait of Ruskin as a man who is moved almost to the point of tears by art, for whom Beauty and the idea of it are two separate things. And there's a chilling accuracy in the way he manages to capture the difference between the way certain men behave with their wives, and the way they talk about them with other men. But more than petulance, what we hear in his voice when he speaks of 'what she was once' and 'what she might be' is romance for the past and the romance of ideal possibility, and we see a man who overvalues both." Clive Barnes of The New York Post wrote "The play is nicely acted, with James Riordan as an appropriately smug and testy Ruskin."

Lovers 

Also Off-Broadway, Riordan appeared in the revival of Brian Friel's Lovers; a pair of related one act plays "Winners" and "Losers". The New York Times called the production "expertly acted". The Associated Press wrote "Riordan is intense and funny as Andy. Brazda and Riordan share a couple of perfectly timed farcical scenes, hastily trying to make love while he frenetically shouts poetry so her mother won't ring that bell" The Wall Street Journal wrote of the performance "What you see in Lovers are Mr. Friel's small-town characters, realized so fully (by Mr. Riordan and Ms. Salata in particular) that they give the impression of having been played by ordinary people. Don't be fooled, though: Mr. Barr's cast knows just what to do with Mr. Friel". The New York Post stated "Kati Brazda and James Riordan are winning as the lovers in "Losers" [their] fumbling expressions of middle-aged lust are hilarious, especially when Hanna abandons all restraint and climbs atop her lover as if he were a mountain to be scaled. The expertly comic performances add to the merriment. All told, "Losers" makes winners of its audience." Time Out wrote "Lovers is beautifully rendered by a strong ensemble (particularly Riordan as the resigned Andy and Salata as the Fiery Mag)." DC Theater Scene wrote, "Riordan, in the Carney role, has everything under control. He's comfortable in the period clothes, he's got the Northern Ireland accent down pat, and he's able to be sinister and commanding one minute, and the oaf complete with pratfalls the next. A lovely performance that drives this family comedy/drama from start to finish," and CurtainUp said, "Riordan is especially engaging, nimbly shifting between monologues and active romps with Hanna. He battles hilariously to get Hanna away from Cissy (Cynthia Darlow), her controlling, overly religious mother. It will come as no surprise that the old battle axe is the winner in this scenario."

Other Off-Broadway work includes a revival of the rarely performed "Donogoo by Jules Romains at the Mint Theater company.  Reviewing the production, John Simon wrote "most of the actors do well, notably James Riordan as Lamendin." Talkin’ Broadway wrote, "Riordan plays our (anti)hero, Lamendin, to comic perfection as the character metamorphoses from a sad sack to a possessed megalomaniac." Time Out said, "The first act is witty, but wordy and meandering, and for much of it, Riordan appears to be biding his time until he can feast on the meatier delights of the second," and Broadway World wrote, "It's to the great credit of the spirited company of actors, projection designers and French playwright Jules Romains himself, that the Mint Theater Company's new production of Donogoo always feels like something wildly funny is just about to happen. Riordan has his amusing moments as the befuddled everyman who grows drunk with power but the whole company seems to be aching for a chance to let loose." CurtainUp wrote: “Riordan handles his Lemandin's many permutations without missing a line. He segues smoothly from insecure sadsack to audacious scoundrel.”

Riordan also appeared with David Eigenberg in the New York premiere of Neal Bell's surrealist play Ready for the River at the Home For Contemporary Theater and Art. The New York Times wrote "the play is superbly acted" and The Village Voice said "James Riordan is a serio-comic standout as the motel keeper haunted by a thrifty ghost."

Regional Theater 

During the summer of 2022, James Riordan appeared with Timothy Busfield in the world premier of a play co-authored by Tom Hanks "Safe Home" The play was based on a series of short stories by Hanks. The play was performed at the Shadowlands Theater Company in Upstate NY. The Sullivan County Democrat called the production "Triumphant" and wrote: "James Riordan steals the show quite a few times as a pissed off Cleveland fan in 1924 who had the audience chortling, and as Virgil Buell’s best friend Bud, a man dealing with the traumatic memories of war, and what it can make a man do" " Broadway World wrote: "Especially versatile in various roles -- including war veteran, baseball fan, and Greek diner owner -- is James Riordan"

Television 

On television, he appeared as Franklin Werner in the HBO series Boardwalk Empire, in a recurring role on the final season of the television series Damages, and in recurring roles on the daytime soap operas As the World Turns and All My Children. He has appeared multiple times on Law & Order, Law & Order: Special Victims Unit and Law & Order: Criminal Intent.  James Riordan also played "James Brett" in the 2012 ABC Studios television pilot Dark Horse directed by Roland Emmerich. In 2014, he appeared as "Ian Wright" on the CBS television series The Blacklist.

Riordan's film credits include The Hoax directed by My Life as a Dog director Lasse Hallstrom and Choose.

Filmography

Film

Television

References

External links 

Living people
American male film actors
American male television actors
1965 births
Male actors from Cleveland